KKIS-FM (96.5 FM) is a commercial Contemporary Hit Radio music radio station in Soldotna, Alaska, broadcasting to the Kenai, Alaska, area.

Other History
Call sign KKIS was previously used by an FM station in Walnut Creek, California at 92.1 MHz, and an AM station in Pittsburg, California at 990 kHz.

External links

KIS-FM
Hot adult contemporary radio stations in the United States
Radio stations established in 1972